The John C. Hieber Building is a historic commercial building located at Utica in Oneida County, New York.

Description and history 
It was built in 1893, and is a five-story, rectangular, flat-roofed, red brick structure, 60 feet by 100 feet, with a random ashlar stone foundation. It was built as a combined sales and warehouse facility. The building is owned by the Utica Children's Museum, which moved into the building in 1979.

It was designed by Utica architect Frederick H. Gouge.

It was listed on the National Register of Historic Places on July 24, 2007.

References

External links
Utica Children's Museum website

Buildings and structures in Utica, New York
Commercial buildings on the National Register of Historic Places in New York (state)
Commercial buildings completed in 1893
National Register of Historic Places in Oneida County, New York